The Antarctic Treaty and related agreements, collectively known as the Antarctic Treaty System (ATS), regulate international relations with respect to Antarctica, Earth's only continent without a native human population. It was the first arms control agreement established during the Cold War, setting aside the continent as a scientific preserve, establishing freedom of scientific investigation, and banning military activity; for the purposes of the treaty system, Antarctica is defined as all the land and ice shelves south of 60°S latitude. Since September 2004, the Antarctic Treaty Secretariat, which implements the treaty system, is headquartered in Buenos Aires, Argentina.

The main treaty was opened for signature on December 1, 1959, and officially entered into force on June 23, 1961. The original signatories were the 12 countries active in Antarctica during the International Geophysical Year (IGY) of 1957–58: Argentina, Australia, Belgium, Chile, France, Japan, New Zealand, Norway, South Africa, the Soviet Union, the United Kingdom, and the United States. These countries had established over 55 Antarctic research stations for the IGY, and the subsequent promulgation of the treaty was seen as a diplomatic expression of the operational and scientific cooperation that had been achieved. , the treaty has 56 parties.

History

1940s
After the Second World War, the U.S. considered establishing a claim in Antarctica. From August 26, 1946, and until the beginning of 1947, it carried out Operation Highjump, the largest military expeditionary force that the United States had ever sent to Antarctica, consisting of 13 ships, 4,700 men, and numerous aerial devices. Its goals were to train military personnel and to test materiel in conditions of extreme cold for a hypothetical war in the Antarctic.

On September 2, 1947, the quadrant of Antarctica in which the United States was interested (between 24° W and 90° W) was included as part of the security zone of the Inter-American Treaty of Reciprocal Assistance, committing its members to defend it in case of external aggression.

In August 1948, the United States proposed that Antarctica be under the guardianship of the United Nations, as a trust territory administered by Argentina, Australia, Chile, France, the United States, the United Kingdom, and New Zealand. This idea was rejected by Argentina, Australia, Chile, France, and Norway. Before the rejection, on August 28, 1948, the United States proposed to the claimant countries some form of internationalization of Antarctica, and this was supported by the United Kingdom. Chile responded by presenting a plan to suspend all Antarctic claims for five to ten years, while negotiating a final solution, but this did not find acceptance.

In 1950, the interest of the United States to keep the Soviet Union away from Antarctica was frustrated, when the Soviets informed the claimant states that they would not accept any Antarctic agreement in which they were not represented. The fear that the USSR would react by making a territorial claim, bringing the Cold War to Antarctica, led the United States to make none.

International conflicts 

Various international conflicts motivated the creation of an agreement for the Antarctic.

Some incidents had occurred during the Second World War, and a new one occurred in Hope Bay on February 1, 1952, when the Argentine military fired warning shots at a group of Britons. The response of the United Kingdom was to send a warship that landed marines at the scene on February 4. In 1949, Argentina, Chile, and the United Kingdom signed a Tripartite Naval Declaration committing not to send warships south of the 60th parallel south, which was renewed annually until 1961 when it was deemed unnecessary when the treaty entered into force. This tripartite declaration was signed after the tension generated when Argentina sent a fleet of eight warships to Antarctica in February 1948.

On January 17, 1953, Argentina reopened the Lieutenant Lasala refuge on Deception Island, leaving a sergeant and a corporal in the Argentine Navy. On February 15, in the incident on Deception Island, 32 royal marines landed from the British frigate HMS Snipe armed with Sten machine guns, rifles, and tear gas capturing the two Argentine sailors. The Argentine refuge and a nearby uninhabited Chilean shelter were destroyed, and the Argentine sailors were delivered to a ship from that country on February 18 near South Georgia. A British detachment remained three months on the island while the frigate patrolled its waters until April.

On May 4, 1955, the United Kingdom filed two lawsuits, against Argentina and Chile respectively, before the International Court of Justice to declare the invalidity of the claims of the sovereignty of the two countries over Antarctic and sub-Antarctic areas. On July 15, 1955, the Chilean government rejected the jurisdiction of the court in that case, and on August 1, the Argentine government also did so, so on March 16, 1956, the claims were closed.

In 1956 and 1958, India tried unsuccessfully to bring the Antarctic issue to the United Nations General Assembly.

International Geophysical Year 
In 1950, the International Council of Scientific Unions (ICSU) had discussed the possibility of holding a third International Polar Year. At the suggestion of the World Meteorological Organization, the idea of the International Polar Year was extended to the entire planet, thus creating the International Geophysical Year that took place between July 1, 1957, and December 31, 1958. In this event, 66 countries participated. At the ICSU meeting in Stockholm from September 9 to 11, 1957, the creation of a Special Committee for Antarctic Research (SCAR) was approved, inviting the twelve countries conducting Antarctic investigations to send delegates to integrate the committee, with the purpose of exchanging scientific information among its members regarding Antarctica. The SCAR was later renamed to the Scientific Committee for Research in Antarctica.

Both Argentina and Chile stated that research carried out on the continent during the International Geophysical Year would not give any territorial rights to the participants, and that the facilities that were erected during that year should be dismantled at the end of it. However, in February 1958, the United States proposed that the Antarctic investigations should be extended for another year, and the Soviet Union reported that it would maintain its scientific bases until the studies being carried out had been  completed.

Negotiation of the treaty 
Scientific bases increased international tension concerning Antarctica. The danger of the Cold War spreading to that continent caused the President of the United States, Dwight D. Eisenhower, to convene an Antarctic Conference of the twelve countries active in Antarctica during the International Geophysical Year, to sign a treaty. In the first phase, representatives of the twelve nations met in Washington, who met in sixty sessions between June 1958 and October 1959 to define a basic negotiating framework. However, no consensus was reached on a preliminary draft. In the second phase, a conference at the highest diplomatic level was held from October 15 to December 1, 1959, when the Treaty was signed. The central ideas with full acceptance were the freedom of scientific research in Antarctica and the peaceful use of the continent. There was also a consensus for demilitarization and the maintenance of the status quo.

The positions of the United States, the Soviet Union, the United Kingdom, and New Zealand coincided in the establishment of an international administration for Antarctica, proposing that it should be within the framework of the United Nations. Australia and the United Kingdom expressed the need for inspections by observers, and the British also proposed the use of military personnel for logistical functions. Argentina proposed that all atomic explosions be banned in Antarctica, which caused a crisis that lasted until the last day of the conference, since the United States, along with other countries, intended to ban only those that were made without prior notice and without prior consultation. The support of the USSR and Chile for the Argentine proposal finally caused the United States to retract its opposition.

The signing of the treaty was the first arms control agreement that occurred in the framework of the Cold War, and the participating countries managed to avoid the internationalization of Antarctic sovereignty.

Other agreements 

Other agreements – some 200 recommendations adopted at treaty consultative meetings and ratified by governments – include:
 Agreed Measures for the Conservation of Antarctic Fauna and Flora (1964) (entered into force in 1982)
 The Convention for the Conservation of Antarctic Seals (1972)
 The Convention for the Conservation of Antarctic Marine Living Resources (1982)
 The Convention on the Regulation of Antarctic Mineral Resource Activities (1988) (signed in 1988, not in force)
 The Protocol on Environmental Protection to the Antarctic Treaty was signed October 4, 1991, and entered into force January 14, 1998; this agreement prevents development and provides for the protection of the Antarctic environment through five specific annexes on marine pollution, fauna and flora, environmental impact assessments, waste management, and protected areas. It prohibits all activities relating to mineral resources except scientific. A sixth annex on liability arising from environmental emergencies was adopted in 2005, but is yet to enter into force.

Bilateral treaties 
 Exchange of Notes constituting an Agreement between the Governments of Australia, New Zealand and the United Kingdom of Great Britain and Northern Ireland, and the Government of the French Republic, regarding Aerial Navigation in the Antarctic (Paris, October 25, 1938)
 Treaty Between the Government of Australia and the Government of the French Republic on Cooperation in the Maritime Areas Adjacent to the French Southern and Antarctic Territories (TAAF), Heard Island and the McDonald Islands (Canberra, November 24, 2003)
 Agreement on Cooperative Enforcement of Fisheries Laws between the Government of Australia and the Government of the French Republic in the Maritime Areas Adjacent to the French Southern and Antarctic Territories, Heard Island and the McDonald Islands (Paris, January 8, 2007)

Meetings 
The Antarctic Treaty System's yearly Antarctic Treaty Consultative Meetings (ATCM) are the international forum for the administration and management of the region. Only 29 of the 56 parties to the agreements have the right to participate in decision-making at these meetings, though the other 27 are still allowed to attend. The decision-making participants are the Consultative Parties and, in addition to the 12 original signatories, including 17 countries that have demonstrated their interest in Antarctica by carrying out substantial scientific activity there. The Antarctic Treaty also has Special Antarctic Treaty Consultative Meetings (SATCM), which are generally summoned to treat more important topics but are less frequents and Meetings of Experts.

Parties 

As of 2023, there are 56 states party to the treaty, 29 of which, including all 12 original signatories to the treaty, have consultative (voting) status. The consultative members include the 7 countries that claim portions of Antarctica as their territory. The 49 non-claimant countries do not recognize the claims of others. 42 parties to the Antarctic Treaty have also ratified the "Protocol on Environmental Protection to the Antarctic Treaty".

* Has an overlapping claim with another one or two claimants.
† Reserved the right to make a claim.

Antarctic Treaty Secretariat 

The Antarctic Treaty Secretariat was established in Buenos Aires, Argentina in September 2004 by the Antarctic Treaty Consultative Meeting (ATCM). Jan Huber (the Netherlands) served as the first Executive Secretary for five years until August 31, 2009. He was succeeded on September 1, 2009, by Manfred Reinke (Germany). Reinke was succeeded by Albert Lluberas (Uruguay), who was elected in June 2017 at the 40th Antarctic Consultative Treaty Meeting in Beijing, China.

The tasks of the Antarctic Treaty Secretariat can be divided into the following areas:
 Supporting the annual Antarctic Treaty Consultative Meeting (ATCM) and the meeting of the Committee for Environmental Protection (CEP).
 Facilitating the exchange of information between the Parties required in the Treaty and the Environment Protocol.
 Collecting, storing, arranging and publishing the documents of the ATCM.
 Providing and disseminating public information about the Antarctic Treaty system and Antarctic activities.

Legal system 
Antarctica currently has no permanent population and therefore it has no citizenship nor government. Personnel present on Antarctica at any time are always citizens or nationals of some sovereignty outside Antarctica, as there is no Antarctic sovereignty. The majority of Antarctica is claimed by one or more countries, but most countries do not explicitly recognize those claims. The area on the mainland between 90 degrees west and 150 degrees west is the only major land on Earth not claimed by any country. Until 2015 the interior of the Norwegian Sector, the extent of which had never been officially defined, was considered to be unclaimed. That year, Norway formally laid claim to the area between its Queen Maud Land and the South Pole.

Governments that are party to the Antarctic Treaty and its Protocol on Environmental Protection implement the articles of these agreements, and decisions taken under them, through national laws. These laws generally apply only to their own citizens, wherever they are in Antarctica, and serve to enforce the consensus decisions of the consultative parties: about which activities are acceptable, which areas require permits to enter, what processes of environmental impact assessment must precede activities, and so on. The Antarctic Treaty is often considered to represent an example of the common heritage of mankind principle.

Australia 

Since the designation of the Australian Antarctic Territory pre-dated the signing of the Antarctic Treaty, Australian laws that relate to Antarctica date from more than two decades before the Antarctic Treaty era. In terms of criminal law, the laws that apply to the Jervis Bay Territory (which follows the laws of the Australian Capital Territory) apply to the Australian Antarctic Territory. Key Australian legislation applying Antarctic Treaty System decisions include the Antarctic Treaty Act 1960, the Antarctic Treaty (Environment Protection) Act 1980 and the Antarctic Marine Living Resources Conservation Act 1981.

United States 
The law of the United States, including certain criminal offences by or against U.S. nationals, such as murder, may apply to areas not under jurisdiction of other countries. To this end, the United States now stations special deputy U.S. Marshals in Antarctica to provide a law enforcement presence.

Some U.S. laws directly apply to Antarctica. For example, the Antarctic Conservation Act, Public Law 95-541,  et seq., provides civil and criminal penalties for the following activities, unless authorized by regulation or statute:
 the taking of native Antarctic mammals or birds
 the introduction into Antarctica of non-indigenous plants and animals
 entry into specially protected or scientific areas
 the discharge or disposal of pollutants into Antarctica or Antarctic waters
 the importation into the U.S. of certain items from Antarctica

Violation of the Antarctic Conservation Act carries penalties of up to US$10,000 in fines and one year in prison. The Departments of the Treasury, Commerce, Transportation, and the Interior share enforcement responsibilities. The Act requires expeditions from the U.S. to Antarctica to notify, in advance, the Office of Oceans and Polar Affairs of the State Department, which reports such plans to other nations as required by the Antarctic Treaty. Further information is provided by the Office of Polar Programs of the National Science Foundation.

New Zealand 
In 2006, the New Zealand police reported that jurisdictional issues prevented them issuing warrants for potential American witnesses who were reluctant to testify during the Christchurch Coroner's investigation into the death by poisoning of Australian astrophysicist Rodney Marks at the South Pole base in May 2000. Dr. Marks died while wintering over at the United States' Amundsen–Scott South Pole Station located at the geographic South Pole. Prior to autopsy, the death was attributed to natural causes by the National Science Foundation and the contractor administering the base. However, an autopsy in New Zealand revealed that Dr. Marks died from methanol poisoning. The New Zealand Police launched an investigation. In 2006, frustrated by lack of progress, the Christchurch Coroner said that it was unlikely that Dr. Marks ingested the methanol knowingly, although there is no certainty that he died as the direct result of the act of another person. During media interviews, the police detective in charge of the investigation criticized the National Science Foundation and contractor Raytheon for failing to co-operate with the investigation.

South Africa 
Under the South African Citizens in Antarctica Act, 1962, South African law applies to all South African citizens in Antarctica, and they are subject to the jurisdiction of the magistrate's court in Cape Town. The Antarctic Treaties Act, 1996 incorporates the Antarctic Treaty and related agreements into South African law. In regard to violations of these treaties, South Africa also asserts jurisdiction over South African residents and members of expeditions organised in South Africa.

See also 

 Antarctic and Southern Ocean Coalition (ASOC)
 Antarctic Protected Areas
 Antarctic Treaty issue
 Arctic Council
 Arctic sanctuary
 Crime in Antarctica
 Endurance – lost ship of Ernest Shackleton, found in 2022 and protected by the treaty
 International Seabed Authority
 Montreal Protocol
 Moon treaty
 Multilateral treaty
 National Antarctic Program
 Category: Outposts of Antarctica
 Research stations in Antarctica
 Solar radiation management
 Svalbard Treaty

References

External links 

 Antarctic Treaty Secretariat
 Full Text of the Antarctic Treaty
 Original facsimile of Antarctic Treaty
 Australian Antarctic Territory

 Why 60 South?
 National Science Foundation – Office of Polar Programs
 List of all Antarctic Treaty Consultative Meetings 
 An Antarctic Solution for the Koreas San Diego Union-Tribune, August 25, 2005 (Both South Korea and North Korea are members of the Antarctic Treaty)
 Emblem of the Antarctic Treaty

Antarctica agreements
1959 in Antarctica
1959 in Washington, D.C.
December 1959 events
1961 in Antarctica
1961 in the environment
Arms control treaties
Cold War treaties
Territorial claims in Antarctica
Treaties concluded in 1959
Treaties entered into force in 1961
Treaties establishing nuclear-weapon-free zones
Treaties of Argentina
Treaties of Australia
Treaties of Austria
Treaties of Belarus
Treaties of Belgium
Treaties of the military dictatorship in Brazil
Treaties of the People's Republic of Bulgaria
Treaties of Canada
Treaties of Chile
Treaties of the People's Republic of China
Treaties of Colombia
Treaties of Cuba
Treaties of Denmark
Treaties of the Czech Republic
Treaties of Czechoslovakia
Treaties of Ecuador
Treaties of Estonia
Treaties of Finland
Treaties of France
Treaties of West Germany
Treaties of East Germany
Treaties of Greece
Treaties of Guatemala
Treaties of the Hungarian People's Republic
Treaties of Italy
Treaties of India
Treaties of Japan
Treaties of Malaysia
Treaties of Monaco
Treaties of the Netherlands
Treaties of New Zealand
Treaties of North Korea
Treaties of Norway
Treaties of Pakistan
Treaties of Papua New Guinea
Treaties of Peru
Treaties of the Polish People's Republic
Treaties of Portugal
Treaties of the Socialist Republic of Romania
Treaties of the Soviet Union
Treaties of Slovakia
Treaties of South Africa
Treaties of South Korea
Treaties of Spain
Treaties of Sweden
Treaties of Switzerland
Treaties of Turkey
Treaties of Ukraine
Treaties of the United Kingdom
Treaties of the United States
Treaties of Uruguay
Treaties of Venezuela
History of the Ross Dependency
December 1959 events in the United States